is a Japanese manga series written and illustrated by George Akiyama. It has been serialized by Shogakukan in Big Comic Original from 1973 to 2017 and collected in 112 tankōbon volumes. Haguregumo received the 1979 Shogakukan Manga Award for the general category.

It was adapted into  a television series on TV Asahi in 1978, airing for 20 episodes and an anime film in 1982 by Madhouse Studios and Toei Animation. Directed by Mori Masaki, it premiered in Japan on the 24 April 1982.

Plot
Set at the end of the Edo period, the series depicts Cloud's family with his wife, Turtle, their 11-year-old son, and 8-year-old daughter. The Clouds are always ignoring work and playing. Cloud is notorious for womanising.

Characters
  is the protagonist of the series. He is a famous womaniser and rarely works.
  is the wife of Cloud and often joins her husband in his idling. 
  is the 11-year-old son of Cloud and Turtle. His personality is completely opposite to that of his father's.
  is the 8-year-old daughter of Cloud and Turtle. She is a tomboy and has a serious attitude, opposite to those of her parents.

Manga

Volume list

Television series 1978 
 Tetsuya Watari as Kumo
 Kaori Momoi as Kame Onna
 Toshio Shiba as Aota
 Rinichi Yamamoto as Shunjyu Oyabun
 Hideji Otaki as Chojyuro Suzuki
 Chishū Ryū as Shibusawa
 Yujiro Ishihara as Iwakichi
Written by Sō Kuramoto.

References

External links
 
 Official Madhouse Haguregumo movie website 
 Gomunime
 

1973 manga
1982 anime films
Animated films based on manga
Films set in the 19th century
1980s Japanese-language films
Jidaigeki films
Madhouse (company)
Manga adapted into films
Seinen manga
Shogakukan franchises
Shogakukan manga
Toei Company films
Winners of the Shogakukan Manga Award for general manga
Toei Animation films
Jidaigeki television series